Dolichoderus caribbaeus is an extinct species of ant in the genus Dolichoderus. Remains were found in the Dominican Amber, and they were described by Wilson in 1985.

References

†
Fossil taxa described in 1985
Hymenoptera of North America
Fossil ant taxa